Dimitrie Cantemir (formerly Silișteni) is a commune in Vaslui County, Western Moldavia, Romania. It is composed of five villages: Grumezoaia, Gușiței, Hurdugi (the commune centre), Plotonești and Urlați.

The commune was named for Prince Dimitrie Cantemir, who was born there.

References

 

Communes in Vaslui County
Localities in Western Moldavia